Melvin Jones (January 13, 1879 – June 1, 1961) was the founder and secretary-treasurer of Lions Clubs International.

He was born in Fort Thomas, Arizona (at that time the Arizona Territory). His father was a captain in the United States Army. In 1886 or 1887, the family moved east when his father was transferred. Melvin Jones settled in Chicago, where he studied at the Union Business and Chaddock colleges of Quincy, Illinois. At age 33 he was the sole owner of his own insurance agency in Chicago and became a member of the local business circle, and was elected secretary shortly thereafter. Melvin Jones was also a Freemason.

After two years, prompted by his personal code – "You can't get very far until you start doing something for somebody else" – Jones proposed that the talents of the circle's members could be better utilized in other areas of community life,  He invited representative from other men's clubs in and around Chicago to a meeting to devise a suitable organization and from that meeting, Jones subsequently integrated his club into an existing initiative that further led to his selection as Secretary of the "International Association of Lions Clubs" later to be named "Lions Clubs International". Jones eventually gave up his insurance agency to work full-time at Lions International Headquarters.

In 1945, Jones represented Lions Clubs International as a consultant at the United Nations Conference on International Organization in San Francisco.

Memorials
There is a memorial to Melvin Jones, in the form of a fifty-foot spire, in his birthplace of Fort Thomas.

At Lions headquarters in Dhaka there is a mural and portrait of Melvin Jones by Bangladeshi sculptor Mrinal Haque.

There is a Melvin Jones Memorial Grandstand in Burnham Park, Philippines.

There is a Melvin Jones Belvedere (with a view of the Alps on a clear day) at Vignale Monferrato, Piedmont, Italy.

There is a Melvin Jones Memorial on Avenida Capital de España, 28042 Madrid [40.461999, -3.615861], 5 minutes from the Campo de las Naciones tube station on Metro Linea 8. The memorial was erected by the Lions Clubs of Spain Multiple District 116.

There is a street, Rua Melvin Jones, in Lisbon and in 9 other towns across Portugal.

There is a street and a school named after Melvin Jones, in Parana, Argentina.  

There is a square, Piazzale Melvin Jones, and bust in Rieti, Italy.

There is a small square, Largo Melvin Jones, in Borgomanero, Italy

The Lions Eye Bank located at San Martino Hospital in Genova is dedicated to Melvin Jones.

In 2017, the United States Mint issued a non-circulating commemorative coin honoring the centennial of the Lions Club; the obverse (heads side) features a depiction of Melvin Jones. The traditional sized silver coin was offered on the United States Mint website (www.usmint.gov) for sale through the end of 2017.

References

1879 births
1961 deaths
American businesspeople
American Freemasons
Lions Clubs International